Jeremy Thomas Hayward (born 3 March 1993) is an Australian field hockey player.

Hayward was part of the Australian team who won the 2014 Men's Hockey World Cup. The team defeated the Netherlands 6–1 in the final. Hayward was also awarded Young Player of the Tournament at this event.

Hayward was selected in the Kookaburras Olympics squad for the Tokyo 2020 Olympics. The team reached the final for the first time since 2004 but couldn't achieve gold, beaten by Belgium in a shootout.

Jeremy's brother Leon Hayward is a New Zealand field hockey player. The two competed against one another at the 2020 Tokyo Olympics.

References

External links
 
 
 

1993 births
Australian male field hockey players
Living people
Sportspeople from Darwin, Northern Territory
Male field hockey defenders
Commonwealth Games medallists in field hockey
Commonwealth Games gold medallists for Australia
2014 Men's Hockey World Cup players
2018 Men's Hockey World Cup players
Field hockey players at the 2018 Commonwealth Games
Field hockey players at the 2022 Commonwealth Games
Youth Olympic gold medalists for Australia
Field hockey players at the 2020 Summer Olympics
Olympic field hockey players of Australia
Olympic silver medalists for Australia
Medalists at the 2020 Summer Olympics
Olympic medalists in field hockey
Sportsmen from the Northern Territory
Australian people of New Zealand descent
2023 Men's FIH Hockey World Cup players
Medallists at the 2018 Commonwealth Games
Medallists at the 2022 Commonwealth Games